is a Japanese manga series written and illustrated by Eisaku Kubonouchi and serialized in the magazine Big Comic Spirits. It was adapted into a Japanese television drama in 2003 and a Taiwan television series in 2013.

Synopsis
Chocolat is a mature comedy series about half-orphan Tatsumi Chiyoko, whose father was caught up in huge debt. Now living with Omugi Matsukichi, an ex-underground king who opened a pastry shop, she gets to know people like Katou Ichigo, an ex-inmate. With people after her father's whereabouts, what will happen to her?

Taiwan Television Series

Cast
Masami Nagasawa
Lan Cheng Long
Kim Woo Bin

Japanese Television Drama

Cast
Otsuka Chihiro
Isao Natsuyagi
Kazuya Takahashi
Sei Hiraizumi

References

External links

1999 manga
2003 Japanese television series debuts
2003 Japanese television series endings
2003 comics endings
2014 Taiwanese television series debuts
2014 Taiwanese television series endings
Manga adapted into television series
Taiwanese television dramas based on manga
Seinen manga
Shogakukan manga
Taiwanese drama television series
Television shows written by Eriko Shinozaki